The WWL Television Championship or in Spanish Campeonato de la Television de la WWL, was a professional wrestling championship promoted by the World Wrestling League (WWL) promotion and partially owned by Mega TV in Puerto Rico.

The championship was generally contested in professional wrestling matches, in which participants execute scripted finishes rather than contend in direct competition.

Title history

References

Regional professional wrestling championships
World Wrestling League Championships
Television wrestling championships